Haijiao (海礁), also known as Tong Island (童岛), Taibujiao (泰簿礁) or Taijiao (泰礁), is located at 30°44'6"N, 123°9'24"E in the northeast corner of the Zhoushan Islands and belongs to Shengsi County of Zhoushan city. The name Haijiao literally means 'the ocean reef', and its generally accepted cartographic name of Taijiao literally means 'the extreme reef', a reference to its isolated position on the edge of China's maritime territory. It is a baseline point of China's territorial seas.

Notes and references

See also
Zhoushanqundao (舟山群岛)
Suyanjiao (Suyan Rock) (苏岩礁)
Dongnanjiao(东南礁)
Sheshandao(佘山岛)

External links
 Declaration of the Government of the People's Republic of China on the baselines of the territorial sea(May15th, 1996)
中国东海１０座领海基点石碑建成
中华人民共和国政府关于中华人民共和国领海基线的声明(1996年5月15日)

Zhoushan
Baselines of the Chinese territorial sea
Islands of Zhejiang
Islands of the East China Sea